Splay may refer to:

Splay, a verb meaning slant, slope or spread outwards
Splay (physiology), the difference between urine threshold and saturation
Splay (Japanese band), a J-pop band from Osaka
Splay Networks, a Sweden-headquartered group of multi-channel networks for Sweden, Finland, Norway, Denmark, and Germany
 In architecture
chamfer, a beveled edge connecting two surfaces
talus (fortification), a sloping face at the base of a fortified wall
Splay (plastics), off-colored streaking that occurs in injection molded plastics
Splay tree, a type of search tree
Splay fault, geology 
Splay leg, a condition in birds and poultry
Splay (Shiner album), 1996
Splay (Jim Black album), 2002